Cells River, a perennial river of the Manning River catchment, is located in the Northern Tablelands and Mid North Coast districts of New South Wales, Australia.

Course and features
Cells River rises on the eastern slopes of the Great Dividing Range, southeast of Yarrowitch, and flows generally southeast before reaching its confluence with the Rowleys River, in high country northwest of Wingham. The river descends  over its  course.

See also 

 Rivers of New South Wales
 List of rivers of New South Wales (A–K)
 List of rivers of Australia

References

External links
 

Rivers of New South Wales
Northern Tablelands
Mid North Coast
Port Macquarie-Hastings Council
Walcha Shire